The High Times Cannabis Cup is a cannabis festival sponsored by High Times magazine. The event features judges from around the world who sample and vote for their favorite marijuana varieties, with cups (trophies) being awarded to the overall winner in the cannabis variety competition. Since 1997, the Cannabis Cup festival has hosted induction ceremonies for the Counterculture Hall of Fame.

Founded in 1988 by High Times editor Steven Hager, the Cannabis Cup is usually held each November in Amsterdam. The first U.S. Cannabis Cup was held in 2010; High Times now holds Cannabis Cups in Northern and Southern California, Denver, Michigan, and Seattle, with plans to hold a Cannabis Cup in Portland in 2015. The High Times Medical Cannabis Cup recognizes medical marijuana in states that have passed medical marijuana laws.

The High Times Cannabis Cup also includes live music, educational seminars, and an expo for marijuana-related products from cannabis-oriented businesses.

History 
A DVD called High Times Presents: The Cannabis Cup was made after the 2003 festival. 

The 20th High Times Cannabis Cup, held in 2007, featured hosts Tommy Chong and Redman; a film of the 2007 festival was released in the summer of 2008.

In 2010, Dutch police raided the Amsterdam Cannabis Cup location. That same year, High Times mounted its first Cannabis Cup in the United States, also inaugurating the High Times Medical Cannabis Cup, an annual event celebrating medical cannabis. The first Medical Cannabis Cup took place in San Francisco, California, on June 19–20, 2010.

In 2014, after 27 years, Amsterdam held what appeared to be its final High Times Cannabis Cup. This decision was partly due to the growing uncertainty about Dutch cannabis laws, the newly available legal cannabis locations in the United States and various other countries, and the after-effects of the 2010 raid. (The Cannabis Cup later returned to Amsterdam.)

In 2017, the festival celebrated its 30th anniversary, with the award show hosted by Danny Danko.

In 2018, the festival was held in the middle of summer, on 13th to 15 July, veering away from its usual schedule.

Categories 
Award categories include Best New Product, Best Booth, Best Glass, Best Hash, and Best Nederhash (hashish that is produced only in the Netherlands). A team of VIP judges decides which seed company has grown the Best Indica, Best Sativa, and Best Hybrid Strain, and which company has produced the Best Nederhash and Best Imported Hash.

The U.S. Cannabis Cup recognizes marijuana in states that have passed laws that legalize marijuana for adult, recreational use. Teams of expert judges vote on Best Indica, Best Sativa, Best Hybrid, Best Concentrates, Best Edibles, and Highest Level of CBD in cannabis products (All cannabis products are tested for THC content and CBD content by independent cannabis-testing laboratories). At each U.S. Cannabis Cup expo, festival attendees vote for Best Booth, Best Products, and Best Glass.

Counterculture Hall of Fame

The Counterculture Hall of Fame celebrates the history of the counterculture and the people who helped shape it. Previous inductees include Bob Marley (1997), Louis Armstrong (1998), William S. Burroughs, Allen Ginsberg, and Jack Kerouac (1999), Bob Dylan (2002), Jack Herer (2003), Tommy Chong and Cheech Marin (2007), Peter Tosh (2008) Tom Forcade (2009) and Coke La Rock (2010). John Griggs, BEL (2011), Steven Hager (2012), Ben Dronkers (2013), and Alexander Shulgin & Ann Shulgin (2014).

Past winners

Overall Cannabis Cup 
 1st Cup 1988 — Skunk #1 from Cultivator's Choice
 2nd Cup 1989 — Early Pearl/Skunk #1 x Northern Lights #5/Haze from the Seed Bank
 3rd Cup 1990 — Northern Lights #5 from the Seed Bank 
 4th Cup 1991 — Skunk from Free City
 5th Cup 1992:
 Haze x Skunk #1 from Homegrown Fantasy
 Master Kush Winner— Hindu Kush X Skunk #1
 6th Cup 1993:
 Haze x Northern Lights #5 from Sensi Seed Bank
 Master Kush Winner — Hindu Kush X Skunk #1
 7th Cup 1994 — Jack Herer from Sensi Seed Bank
 8th Cup 1995 — White Widow from the Green House
 9th Cup 1996 — White Russian from De Dampkring
 10th Cup 1997 — Peace Maker from De Dampkring
 11th Cup 1998 — Super Silver Haze from the Green House
 12th Cup 1999 — Super Silver Haze from the Green House
 13th Cup 2000 — Blueberry from the Noon
 14th Cup 2001 — Sweet Tooth from Barney's
 15th Cup 2002 — Morning Glory from Barney's
 16th Cup 2003 — Hawaiian Snow from Green House
 17th Cup 2004 — Amnesia Haze from Barney's
 18th Cup 2005 — Willie Nelson from Barney's
 19th Cup 2006 — Arjan's Ultra Haze #1 from Green House
 20th Cup 2007 — G-13 Haze from Barney's
 21st Cup 2008 — Super Lemon Haze from Green House United
 22nd Cup 2009 — Super Lemon Haze from Green House United
 23rd Cup 2010 — Tangerine Dream from Barney's
 24th Cup 2011 — Liberty Haze from Barney's
 25th Cup 2012 — Flower Bomb Kush from the Green House
 26th Cup 2013 — Rollex OG Kush from The Green Place
 27th Cup 2014 — MaraDawg Blue Flake Cheese Pearl from Chopper Special

17th Cup (2004) winners 
Overall Cannabis Cup

 Amnesia Haze by Barney's Breakfast Bar
 Killer Green by Katsu
 Jack Flash by Sensi Seeds

Indica Cup

 God Bud by BC Bud Depot
 MK Ultra by TH Seeds
 L.A. Confidential by DNA Genetics

Sativa Cup

 Love Potion No. 1 by Reeferman Seeds
 Arjan's Haze No. 1 by Green House Seeds
 Sage 'N Sour by TH Seeds

Import Hash Cup

 Caramella Cream by Barney's Breakfast Bar
 Royal Cream Gold by Rokerij
 Nepal Pollen Shoe by Green House Seeds

18th Cup (2005) winners 
Overall Cannabis Cup

 Willie Nelson by Barney's
 Arjan's Schoenmaker Zwevers Ultra Haze 2 by Green House
 Silver Haze by Coffeeshop Dampkring

Indica Cup (Seed Company)

 Lavender by Soma Seeds
 LA Confidential by DNA
 Sensi Star by Paradise Seeds

Sativa Cup (Seed Company)

 Martian Mean Green by DNA
 Nebula by Paradise Seeds
 Kushage by THSeeds
 Romulan by Meekseeds

Import Hash Cup

 Caramella Cream by Barney's
 Rifman Malika by De Dampkring
 King Hassan by Green House

Nederhash Cup

 Waterworks by De Dampkring
 Kadni Bubble by Barney's
 Arjan's Ultra 2 Haze Hash by Green House

Glass Cup

 Triple Perculator by Green Devil
 D-Line by DNA
 Opal Smooth by ROOR Glass

Product Award

 Vapezilla by Wicked Roots
 Pollinator by Bubblator
 Mini Matches by De Dampkrin
 Phil Lesh Kadeshhh by Golden Bud of Unlimited Tokevotion

19th Cup (2006) winners 
Cannabis Cup

 Arjan's  Ultra Haze #1 - Green House
 G13 Haze - Barney's
 Martian Mean Green - Grey Area

Sativa Cup

 Mako Haze - Kiwiseeds
 Opium - Paradise Seeds
 Blue Cheese - Big Buddha Seeds

Indica

 Big Buddha Cheese - Big Buddha Seeds
 Fruity Thai - Ceres Seeds
 Night Shade - Barney's

Hash

 Sexpot Holland- Netherlands, Holland Home Brew
 Carmello Cream - Barney's
 Carmello Royale - Green House
 Rifman's Noor - De Dampkring

Nederhash

 Barney Rubble - Barney's
 Water Works - De Dampkring
 Master Kush Isolater - Green House

Product

 Super Vapezilla - Wicked Roots
 Portable Vortex Gravity Bong - Gravity Vortex
 Aleda Papers - Aleda

Expo

 Barney's Farm
 Green House
 Wicked Roots

20th Cup (2007) winners 
Cannabis Cup

 G-13 Haze - Barney's
 Chocolope - Grey Area
 Super Silver Haze - Green House United

Indica Cup

 Top Dog - Amnesia Seeds
 Crimea Blue - Barney's Farm
 Reserva Privada #18 - Reserva Privada

Sativa Cup

 Kaia Kush - Apothecary
 Tasman Haze - Kiwi Seeds
 The Purps - BC Bud Depot

Neder Hash

 Violator Ice-o-lator - Barney's
 Bubble Mania - Green House United
 Grey Crystals - Grey Area

Import Hash

 Triple X - Barney's
 King Hassan Supreme - Green House United
 Rifman's Habibi - De Dampkring

Product Cup

 Barney's Gift Bag - Barney's
 Portable Vortex Gravity Bong - Gravity Vortex
 Vaporstar Vaporizer by Vaporstar

Best Booth

 Barney's Farm
 DNA Seeds
 Green House Seeds

21st Cup (2008) winners 
Cannabis Cup

 Super Lemon Haze - Greenhouse United
 Utopia Haze - Barney's
 Chocolope - The Green Place

Indica Cup

 Mt. Cook - Kiwi Seeds
 Cheese - Homegrown Fantaseeds
 LSD - Amnesia Seeds

Sativa Cup

 Utopia Haze - Barney's
 DeLaHaze - Paradise
 Cannatonic - Resin Seeds

Neder Hash

 Royal Jelly - Barney's
 Greenhouse Ice - Greenhouse
 Grey Crystal - Grey Area

Import Hash

 Triple Zero - Barney's
 Super Palm - Greenhouse
 Shiraz - Amnesia

Product Cup

(tie) 1. BC Chillum - Barney's
(tie) 1. Pocket Alchemy - DNA
2. Bubble Bags - Bubble Bags
3. Glass Vaporizer - Herborizer

Best Booth

 Barney's

Glass Cup

 AK - DNA Genetics
 Mr Nice Custom - RooR
 MOE - Green Devil

22nd Cup (2009) winners 
Cannabis Cup

 Super Lemon Haze - Green House
 Vanilla Kush - Barney's
 Head Band Kush - The Green Place

Indica Cup

 Starbud - Hortilab
 OG18 - Reserva Privada
 Kush D - AllStar Genetics

Sativa Cup

 Super Lemon Haze - Green House
 The Purps - BC Bud Depot

Neder Hash

 Royal Jelly - Barney's
 Greenhouse Ice - Green House
 Grey Crystal - Grey Area

Import Hash

 Rif Cream - Greenhouse
 Triple Zero - Barney's
 Azilla - Amnesia

Product Cup

 Vapor Swing - Original Design by HMK
 Incredibowl i420 - Incredibowl Industries
 Strain Hunters DVD - Green House

Best Booth

 Greenhouse Seed co
 Barney Farm
 Big Buddha Seeds

Glass Cup

 RooR Excalibur
 shattered dreams
 Incredibowl i420 - Incredibowl Industries

23rd Cup (2010) winners 
Cannabis Cup

 Tangerine Dream – Barney's Coffeeshop
 Super Lemon Haze – Greenhouse United
 L.A. Cheese - The Green Place

Indica Cup

 Kosher Kush – Reserva Privada
 Cold Creek Kush - TH Seeds
 White OG - Karma Genetics

Sativa Cup

 Acapulco Gold – Amnesia Seeds
 Chocolope – DNA Genetics
 Sour Power - Hortilab

Neder Hash

 Tangerine Nectar Ice-O-Lator - Greenhouse
 Tangerine Nectar Iceolator- Barney's
 Grey Area Crystal - Grey Area

Import Hash

 Caramella Cream- Barney's Coffeeshop
 Rif Cream – Greenhouse United
 Twizla – The Green Place

Product Cup

 Barney's Bud Scope – Barney's
 Strainhunters India DVD - Greenhouse Seed Co.
 - Vapir

Best Booth

 Barney Farm
 Greenhouse Seed Co.
 Attitude Seed Bank

Glass Cup

 Ghost - RooR
 The Klingon – The Cali Connection
 Dragon Bong – Dragon Bong & Earth Spirit

Freedom Fighter of the Year

24th Cup (2011) winners 
Cannabis Cup

 Liberty Haze – Barney's Coffeeshop
 Hawaiian Snow – Greenhouse United
 Buddha Tahoe - The Green Place

Indica Cup

 Kosher Kush - Reserva Privada
 Star Bud - Hortilab
 Tahoe OG - Cali Connection

Sativa Cup

 Moonshine Haze - Rare Dankness Seed co
 Electric Lemon Haze - TH Seeds
 Dominator - Karma Genetics

25th Cup (2012) winners 
Cannabis Cup

 Flower Bomb Kush - the Green House Coffeeshop
 Shoreline - the Green Place
 Evergrey - the Grey Area

Indica Cup

 Kosher Kush – Reserva Privada
 True OG - Elemental Seeds
 SFV OG Kush - Cali Connection

Sativa Cup

 Amnesia Haze - Soma's Sacred Seeds
 Sour Amnesia - Hortilab
 Green Shack - Strain Hunters Seedbank

Hybrid

 Loud Scout - Loud Seeds
 Rock Star - Bonguru Seeds
 Rug Burn OG - Rare Dankness Seedse

Neder Hash

 Lemon Crystal - the Green House Coffeeshop
 Grey Crystal - the Grey Area
 M.O.G - the Green Place

Seed Company Hash

 The Wheezy - Reserva Privada
 Tangerine Compound - Rare Dankness Seeds
 The Tangie - DNA Genetics

Import Hash

 Sharkberry Cream - the Green House Coffeeshop
 Twizzler - the Green Place
 Maroc Lemon Haze - The Bushdocter

Product Cup

 Big Buddha Seeds Goodie Bag - Big Buddha Seeds
 PUFFiT Inhaler/Vaporizer - VapoShop and Discreet Vape
 Tiny Sister - Roor

Best Booth

 Big Buddha Seeds
 Cali Connection
 Roor

Glass Cup

 Drill Bill - Roor Glass
 Puk Pipe - Puk Pipe
 The MF Doom Borch - DNA Genetics and Hitman Glass

CBD Award

 Lion's Tabernacle - Cali Connection

Freedom Fighter of the Year

 Mason Tvert

Dutch Master Honorees

 Wernard Bruining and Nol van Schaik

26th Cup (2013) winners 
Cannabis Cup

 Rollex OG Kush – the Green Place
 Flowerbomb Kush – the Green House
 Tangie - the Bushdoctor  Coffeeshop

Indica Cup

 Whitewalker OG – Gold Coast Extract
 True OG - Elemental Seeds
 KnightsBridge OG – Lady Sativa Genetics

Sativa Cup

 Tangie – Reserva Privada
 Sour Power - Hortilab
 Headbangar- Karma Genetics

Hybrid

 Somari – Soma's Sacred Seeds
 Girl Scout Cookies – Tahoe Wellness Cooperatives
 Dieseltonic – Resin Seeds

Neder Hash

 Lemon Crystal - the Green House Coffeeshop
 Shoreline Solventless - the Green Place
 Tangie Wax – the Bushdoctor Coffeeshop

Seed Company Hash

 Lemon Cleaner OG Nectar – TCLabs/TerpX/EmoTex
 Whitewalker OG – Gold Coast Extracts
 Chemblend Solventless Wax – Elemental Seeds/Essential Extracts/ Johnny Trill

Import Hash

 Twizzla - the Green Place
 Chemdog Cream- the Green House
 Maroc Lemon Haze - The Bushdocter

Product Cup

 Buddha Giftbag - Big Buddha Seeds
 Cloud V – Cloud V
 Sublimator - Sublimator

Best Booth

 Big Buddha Seeds
 Devil's Harvest
 Sensi Seeds

Glass Cup

 Master Yoda/Big Buddha Seeds – Honey Collabs Collection
 Loud/Silka – Sika Glass
 Ray Pack - Roor

CBD Award

 Cannatonic- Elemental Seeds

Inductee High Times Hall of Fame

 Ben Dronkers

27th Cup (2014) winners 
Cannabis Cup

Best Coffeeshop Flowers
 Barney's Coffeeshop- Cookies Kush 
 Green Place - OG Reekn
 The Green House - Pure Kush

Best Sativa by a Seed Company
 Crockett Family Farms - Tangie Crockett's Cut
 DNA Genetics - Tangie
 PhenoFinders - Lemon Bubble

Best Indica by a Seed Company 
 The Vault Genetics - Colorado Bubba
 True Canna Genetics - The Truth
 DNA Genetics - Kosher Kush

Best Hybrid by a Seed Company
 The Vault Genetics - Larry OG
 Rare Dankness Seeds - Star Killer
 BC Bud Depot - Night Nurse

Best Import Hash (Concentrates) by a Seed Company
 Loud Pack Extractions & Greenwolf, LA - Super Lemon OG Concentrate
 Oasis Medical Seeds in Flint, MI - Paris OG Shatter Dab Vader
 DNA Unlimited - Lemon OG 18 Live Resin

Best Neder Hash by a Coffeeshop
 Barney's Coffeeshop - Cookies Ice-Cream
 The Green House -Green House Ice 
 The Grey Area - Grey Crystan

Best Import Hash Coffeeshop
 the Green House - Super Lemon Haze Cream
 Barney's Coffeeshop - Carmella Cream
 The Green Place - Twisla

Best Neder Hash by a Seed Company
 The Vault Genetics - The Kong 73 Non-Solvent Hash
 DNA Grow Your Own - Betty Ross
 Drysift by House of the Great Gardener -Barb 99

CBD Flowers
House of the Great Gardener - CBD Rene

CBD Concentrate
 CannaVest - CBD Simple

Best Product
 The Loud Seeds Gift Bag
 Devil's Harvest
 Sensi Seeds

Best Glass
 Roor
 Flav421 History in the Making by the Dampkring Gallery
 Team Japan Onigari/ Demon Hunter by the Dampkring Gallery

See also

List of cannabis competitions

References

External links
 
 YouTube site
 Cannabis Cup Winners, Awards & History 
 The story of the Cannabis Castle, run by Neville Shoenmaker a.k.a. The King Of Cannabis
 The 1st European Tour Operator for the HTCC Amsterdam

1988 in cannabis
American cannabis awards
Autumn events in the Netherlands
Cannabis awards
Cannabis culture
Cannabis events
Culture in Amsterdam
Dutch culture
Festivals in the Netherlands
Recurring events established in 1988